Two Hills can refer to:

 Two Hills, Alberta, a town in Alberta, Canada
 County of Two Hills No. 21, a municipal district in Alberta, Canada